Action Research is a quarterly peer-reviewed academic journal that covers the field of action research. The journal was established in 2003 and is published by SAGE Publications. The editor-in-chief is Hilary Bradbury (AR+ Foundation).

Abstracting and indexing
The journal is abstracted and indexed in Scopus and the Social Sciences Citation Index. According to the Journal Citation Reports, the journal has a 2020 impact factor of 2.102.

References

External links

SAGE Publishing academic journals
Quarterly journals
Publications established in 2003
English-language journals
Sociology journals